General elections were held in Japan on 25 June 2000 to elect the 480 members of the House of Representatives.

The ruling Liberal Democratic Party (LDP) maintained a majority in the House of Representatives, but its total percentage of seats shrank from 65% to 56%, and its two coalition partners also lost several seats. Two cabinet members, Takashi Fukaya and Tokuichiro Tamazawa, lost their seats. The Democratic Party made major gains under the leadership of Yukio Hatoyama.

Background
Prime Minister Keizo Obuchi suffered a stroke in April 2000 and was replaced by Yoshiro Mori. Although the term limit for the House of Representatives would have been reached in October 2000, Mori dissolved the House on June 2 in what became popularly known as the  due to a controversial statement by Mori prior to the election, which preceded a slump in government approval ratings from 40% to 20%. The LDP government advocated continued public works spending while the opposition advocated less spending and more governmental reforms.

The Social Democratic Party left the coalition in 1998 and re-join the opposition after years of coalition with the ideologically contrasting LDP.

Meanwhile, the Komeito Party, a centrist party with roots from the Soka Gakkai based on the Nichiren Buddhist movement and despite almost decades of opposition against the LDP, shifted from centre towards conservatism. An electoral alliance between the once rivals of the Komeito and the LDP has been in effect since the Japanese General election in 2000. For the LDP, despite not being able to win an absolute majority of votes by itself in further elections (especially for the House of Councillors which the LDP lost majority since 1989), the Komeito party has been counted on since then to ensure a stable governing majority rule.

Results

The House of Representatives consisted of 480 members, 300 elected from single-member constituencies and 180 elected on a proportional basis from eleven multi-member 
constituencies known as Block constituencies.

By prefecture

By PR block

References

Japan
General election
2000
general election
Election and referendum articles with incomplete results